Usman Malik (born 20 July 1988 in Lahore) is a Pakistani cricketer who played in the U-19 Cricket World Cup for Pakistan. He plays for Lahore cricket team.

References

External links
 

1988 births
Living people
Pakistani cricketers
Cricketers from Lahore
Lahore Eagles cricketers
Lahore Blues cricketers